is a song recorded by Japanese band Official Hige Dandism from their first studio album Escaparade, released on April 11, 2018. The song was featured as a theme song for live-action film adaptation of the manga Love Me, Love Me Not. It peaked at  11 on the Billboard Japan Hot 100.

Composition and lyrics
"115man Kilo no Film" is composed in the key of E-flat major, 97 beats per minute with a running time of 5 minutes and 24 seconds. Written and composed by vocalist/pianist Satoshi Fujihara, the song is described by the band as the desire to not forget the time to live with the people we care about as much as possible while sharing any minor anxiety and happiness together.

Music video
The live version video of the song was released on April 5, 2019 and directed by Akitaka Deguchi. It is taken from Higedan Acoustic One-Man Live 2018 –Autumn– Live DVD. As of September 2021, it has over 43 million views on YouTube. On July 11, 2020, the short version video of the song was released by Toho YouTube channel, contains scenes of the female protagonist Akari Yamamoto from live-action film of the manga Love Me, Love Me Not.

Personnel
Official Hige Dandism
 Satoshi Fujihara – lead vocals, piano, lyrics, composer
 Daisuke Ozasa – guitar, backing vocals
 Makoto Narazaki – bass guitar, backing vocals
 Masaki Matsuura – drums, backing vocals

Charts

Weekly charts

Year-end charts

References

External links
 

2018 songs
Japanese pop songs
Japanese film songs
Official Hige Dandism songs